Socialist Workers Party (in Spanish: Partido Socialista de los Trabajadores, or PST) is a trotskyist political party in Peru.

In 1980, PST had its candidates on the lists of PRT. On March 7, 1982, the majority wing of the Revolutionary Marxist Workers Party (POMR), led by Senator Ricardo Napurí, merged into PST.

PST is a member of LIT-CI. It publishes Bandera Socialista.

In 1992, PST split, and a group adhering to UIT-CI formed a parallel PST.

References

External links
 PST website

Political parties established in 1971
Communist parties in Peru
International Workers League – Fourth International
Trotskyist organisations in Peru